The 2014 Bauer Watertechnology Cup was a professional tennis tournament played on carpet courts. It was the 18th edition of the tournament which was part of the 2014 ATP Challenger Tour. It took place in Eckental, Germany between 27 October and 2 November 2014.

Singles main-draw entrants

Seeds

 1 Rankings are as of 20 October 2014.

Other entrants
The following players received wildcards into the singles main draw:
  Johannes Härteis
  Kevin Krawietz
  Maximilian Marterer
  Philipp Petzschner

The following player received entry by a protected ranking:
  Sergei Bubka

The following players received entry from the qualifying draw:
  Mirza Bašić
  Denis Matsukevich
  Antonio Šančić
  Filip Veger

Champions

Singles

 Ruben Bemelmans def.  Tim Pütz 7–6(7–3), 6–3

Doubles

 Ruben Bemelmans /  Niels Desein def.  Andreas Beck /  Philipp Petzschner 6–3, 4–6, [10–8]

External links
Official Website

Bauer Watertechnology Cup
Challenger Eckental
Ecken